WNLF is a commercial radio station in Macomb, Illinois, broadcasting on 95.9 MHz FM. WNLF airs a country music format branded as "Backroad Country 95.9".

Formerly part of the husband-and-wife Prestige Communications radio group, WNLF obtained its license on 16 March 2001 and had been owned by Nancy L. Foster via Colchester Radio, Inc. since its inception. Effective November 30, 2015, WNLF and five sister stations were sold to Fletcher Ford's Virden Broadcasting Corp. at a purchase price of $725,000.

On August 26, 2015, WNLF changed their format from modern rock to country, branded as "Backroad Country 95.9".

References

External links

Macomb, Illinois
Radio stations established in 2001
NLF
Country radio stations in the United States
2001 establishments in Illinois